The Eastern Mole or Common Mole (Scalopus aquaticus) is a medium-sized North American mole. It is the only member of genus Scalopus. It is found in forested and open areas with moist sandy soils in northern Mexico, the eastern United States and the southwestern corner of Ontario in Canada.

The eastern mole has grey-brown fur with silver-grey underparts, a pointed nose and a short tail. Its front paws are broad and spade-shaped, specialized for digging. It has 36 teeth. Its eyes are covered by fur and its ears are not visible.

The eastern mole spends most of its time underground, foraging in shallow burrows for earthworms, grubs, beetles, insect larvae and some plant matter. It is active year-round. It is mainly solitary except during mating in early spring. The female has a litter of two to five young in a deep burrow.

Subspecies
A majority of the moles throughout their range are Scalopus aquaticus aquaticus. All the other subspecies exist in small pocket ranges.

See also
Rockport virus
Hantavirus pulmonary syndrome
Mole (animal) for more general information on moles

References

External links

Mammals described in 1758
Taxa named by Carl Linnaeus
Fauna of the Southeastern United States
Mammals of Mexico
Mammals of the United States
Talpidae